Schinia edwardsii is a moth of the family Noctuidae. It is found from north-western Wyoming west to Montana, Idaho and eastern Oregon.

The wingspan is 17–21 mm.

External links
Images
Butterflies and Moths of North America

Schinia
Moths of North America
Moths described in 1906